Kevin Andre Keatts (born July 28, 1972) is an American college basketball coach. He is the current men's head coach at North Carolina State University.

Early life and playing career 
Keatts grew up as an only child in Lynchburg, Virginia.  His father was a masonry instructor at Amherst County High School, and Keatts worked as his apprentice on the weekends.  He attended Heritage High School and played point guard on their basketball team as well as quarterback on their football team.  As starting quarterback, Keatts led the football team to be ranked the best in the state, losing only one game his entire career.  He played basketball for Ferrum College, averaging 13.3 points per game by his senior year.

Coaching career
Keatts began his coaching career as an assistant at Southwestern Michigan College for the 1996–97 season. He then went to Hargrave Military Academy as an assistant coach for two seasons before being promoted to head coach in 1999. In 2001, Keatts moved to Marshall as an assistant coach to Greg White. He returned to Hargrave in 2003 and served as the head coach until 2011. During his ten years (over two stints) as the head coach at Hargrave, Keatts had a record of 262–17.

In 2011, he earned a degree from Marshall University. Keatts then joined the staff of Rick Pitino at Louisville and was a part of the Cardinals' 2013 NCAA Division I national championship team which was later vacated by the NCAA because of recruiting violations that occurred from December 2010 until June 2014. Citing Keatts' coaching and recruiting prowess, Pitino promoted Keatts to the position of associate head coach in January 2014.

On March 27, 2014, he was named the head coach of UNC Wilmington (UNCW), succeeding Buzz Peterson.  In Keatts' first season at UNCW he was named CAA Conference Coach of the Year after leading the Seahawks to their first conference championship in nine years, and first winning season in seven years.

In his second year, Keatts repeated his rookie-year double, once again winning the CAA regular-season championship and Conference Coach of the Year.  In winning the 2016 conference coach of the year, he became the first coach in CAA history to ever win the award in consecutive years.

On March 17, 2017, Keatts became the 23rd head coach at North Carolina State University, succeeding Mark Gottfried. Keatts is the first Wolfpack head coach to defeat Duke, North Carolina, and Wake Forest in his first attempt since Tal Stafford during the 1918–19 season. After being projected to finish 12th in the ACC, Keatts led what recruits were left from Mark Gottfried Wolfpack to a tied-for-third-place finish in the conference, as well as earning an at-large bid to the NCAA tournament.

Head coaching record

College

References

External links
 NC State profile

1972 births
Living people
American men's basketball coaches
American men's basketball players
Basketball coaches from Virginia
Basketball players from Virginia
College men's basketball head coaches in the United States
Ferrum Panthers men's basketball players
High school basketball coaches in the United States
Junior college men's basketball coaches in the United States
Louisville Cardinals men's basketball coaches
Marshall Thundering Herd men's basketball coaches
Marshall University alumni
NC State Wolfpack men's basketball coaches
Sportspeople from Lynchburg, Virginia
UNC Wilmington Seahawks men's basketball coaches
Guards (basketball)